The red-billed scythebill (Campylorhamphus trochilirostris) is a species of bird in the Dendrocolaptinae subfamily.

The red-billed scythebill is a fairly large species of woodcreeper. The total length of the species is 24–28 cm (9.5–11 in). As its name indicates, the bill is long, downcurved and reddish in coloration. The back is red-brown and the belly is lighter cinnamon-brown shade. The throat and head are covered in brown and white streaks.

This species picks insects and other invertebrates out of the trunks of trees and branches of trees. The red-billed scythebill is often a solitary bird when not mating but often joins mixed-species flocks. 2 to 3 eggs are laid in an abandoned woodpecker hole or other tree cavity. Both parents participate in incubating eggs and feeding nestlings.

This species is one of the most widely distributed woodcreepers. It is found in Argentina, Bolivia, Brazil, Colombia, Ecuador, Panama, Paraguay, Peru, and Venezuela. Its natural habitats are subtropical or tropical dry forests, subtropical or tropical moist lowland forests, and subtropical or tropical moist montane forests. It is mostly a montane bird and can be found up to elevations of 2,000 m.

References

red-billed scythebill
Birds of Panama
Birds of South America
Birds of Colombia
Birds of Venezuela
Birds of Ecuador
Birds of the Gran Chaco
Birds of Brazil
Birds of the Amazon Basin
Birds of the Caatinga
Birds of Bolivia
Birds of Paraguay
red-billed scythebill
Taxonomy articles created by Polbot